The 1990 New York Jets season was the 31st season for the team and the 21st in the National Football League. It began with the team, under new head coach Bruce Coslet, trying to improve from winning only four games in 1989 under Joe Walton. The Jets finished the season at 6–10.

Offseason 
The Jets modified their uniforms for the 1990 season, adding a thin black outline to the numerals, striping and helmet decals and changing the facemask color from white to black. The team also added a set of green pants, to be worn with its white jerseys. The green pants had a single white stripe with thin black borders from hip to knee on each side.

Coaching change
After finishing the 1989 season with a 4-12 record, the Jets fired head coach Joe Walton after seven seasons. The team hired Cincinnati Bengals offensive coordinator Bruce Coslet to replace him. Walton’s entire coaching staff was also not retained; among Coslet’s hires was Minnesota Vikings defensive backs coach Pete Carroll, who became his defensive coordinator.

NFL Draft

Personnel

Staff

Roster

Regular season

Schedule

Game summaries

Week 2

Standings

References

External links 
 1990 statistics

New York Jets seasons
New York Jets
New York Jets season
20th century in East Rutherford, New Jersey
Meadowlands Sports Complex